Tattoos & Tequila is the fourth and most recent solo studio album by Mötley Crüe frontman Vince Neil. It is his first solo release in 7 years since the live album Live at the Whisky: One Night Only in 2003 and first solo studio album in 15 years since 1995's Carved in Stone. It is  his first release on Eleven Seven Music.

Background
The album is largely made up of covers of 1970s rock songs, with only a couple of original tracks thrown in: the title track and lead single "Tattoos & Tequila", written by Marti Frederiksen, and "Another Bad Day", written by Nikki Sixx, James Michael and Tracii Guns. Neil described the album as having "nothing to do with Motley Crue... Tattoos and Tequila is basically my life".

Tattoos and Tequila was recorded with current Slaughter members Jeff Blando (guitar), Dana Strum (bass) and drummer Zoltan Chaney.

The album is a soundtrack to the book Vince released in the same year, "Tattoos & Tequila: To Hell and Back with One of Rock's Most Notorious Frontmen". Each song on the record corresponds with a chapter in the book. The album's title track was released as a single and charted at number 36 on the Billboard Mainstream Rock charts and features a music video.

As stated in an interview conducted with Nikki Sixx on Sixx Sense radio, the track, "Another Bad Day" was originally slated for Mötley Crüe. However, the band's drummer Tommy Lee disliked the song.

In 2010, Vince played "Another Piece of Meat" onstage with the hard rock band Scorpions.

Track listing

Credits
Vince Neil – lead vocals
Jeff Blando – guitars, backing vocals
Dana Strum – bass
Zoltan Chaney – drums, percussion

Charts

Album

Singles

References

Vince Neil albums
2010 albums
Covers albums
Eleven Seven Label Group albums